Johann Hoffmann may refer to:

 Giovanni Hoffmann (worked c. 1799), Viennese mandolinist, composer, also known as Johann Hoffman
 Johann Hoffmann (bishop) (1375–1451), German theologian, professor, and bishop
 Johann Hoffmann (neurologist) (1857–1919), German neurologist and neuropathologist
 Johann Joseph Hoffmann (1805–1878), German scholar of Japanese and Chinese languages
 Johann Wilhelm Hoffmann (1710–1739), German historian, jurist and writer
 Johann Hoffmann (footballer) (1908–1974), Austrian footballer
 Johann Heinrich Hoffmann (1669–1716), German astronomer
 Johann Leonard Hoffmann (1710–1782), Maastricht army surgeon and amateur geologist
 Johann Baptist Hoffmann (1863–1937), German operatic baritone and voice teacher

See also
 Johannes Hoffmann (disambiguation)